Bulacan may refer to places in the Philippines:

 Bulacan province
 Bulakan municipality
 Bulacan River